David Weissert (February 6, 1913 – September 25, 1989) was a member of the Ohio House of Representatives.

References

1913 births
1989 deaths
Members of the Ohio House of Representatives
20th-century American politicians